The 2019 Korea–Thailand Pro Volleyball All-Star Super Match presented by Mitsubishi Xpander will be the 3rd staging of the Korea–Thailand Pro Volleyball All-Star Super Match, the annual friendly tournament between Thailand women's national volleyball team and Korea Republic women's national volleyball team. The first match will be held in 5 April 2019 in Nakhon Ratchasima and the second one will be held in 7 April 2019 in Bangkok.

Background

Squads

Korea All-Stars team

Thailand All-Stars team

Match 1

Match 2

See also
2019 Thailand vs Japan Invitation Tournament

References

2019
2019 in women's volleyball